Bede Susan Morea (born 29 December 1980) is a former Papua New Guinean woman cricketer. She represented Papua New Guinea in the 2008 Women's Cricket World Cup Qualifier.

References

External links 

Profile at CricHQ

1980 births
Living people
Papua New Guinean women cricketers